Thomas Dinger (28 October 1952 — 9 April 2002) was a German drummer, singer and songwriter who was active in solo pursuits in addition to having been a member of Neu! and La Düsseldorf, both with his brother Klaus Dinger, and 1-A Düsseldorf.

Discography

Solo albums (as Thomas Dinger)
 Für Mich (1982)

with Neu!
 Neu! 75 (1975)

with La Düsseldorf
 La Düsseldorf (1976)
 Viva (1978)
 Individuellos (1981)

with La! NEU?
Goldregen (1998)

with 1-A Düsseldorf
 Fettleber (1999)
 Königreich Bilk (1999)
 D.J.F.(2000)
 Live (2001)
 Pyramidblau'' (2003, memorial album recorded by his bandmates)

References

External links
Intervall-audio article

1952 births
2002 deaths
German rock drummers
Male drummers
Neu!
20th-century German male musicians